The Balabansai Formation (sometimes transcribed Balabansay, also known as Balabansai Svita) is a geological formation in Kazakhstan, Kyrgyzstan and Uzbekistan whose strata date back to the Bathonian and Callovian stages of the Middle Jurassic. Dinosaur remains are among the fossils that have been recovered from the formation. The lithology primarily consists of variegated sandstones, siltstones, claystones, and rare gravels and marls. Many taxa have been found in the formation, including amphibians and mammals

Vertebrate paleofauna
Indeterminate Avialae remains located in Ongtustik Qazaqstan Oblysy, Kazakhstan.

Fish

Amphibians

Turtles

Lizards

Choristoderes

Crocodyliformes

Dinosaurs

Pterosaurs

Mammals

Invertebrate paleofauna

Molluscs

Flora

Conifers

Ferns

See also 
 List of dinosaur-bearing rock formations

References 

Geologic formations of Kazakhstan
Geologic formations of Kyrgyzstan
Geologic formations of Uzbekistan
Jurassic System of Asia
Jurassic Kazakhstan
Bathonian Stage
Callovian Stage
Sandstone formations
Siltstone formations
Shale formations
Deltaic deposits
Fluvial deposits
Paleontology in Kazakhstan
Paleontology in Kyrgyzstan
Paleontology in Uzbekistan